Evolutionary Anthropology is a review journal of anthropology. The journal also includes reviews of relevant new books, letters to the editor, and educational material for classroom teaching on evolutionary anthropology. The editor-in-chief is Jason Kamilar (University of Massachusetts). According to the Journal Citation Reports, the journal has a 2020 impact factor of 6.086, ranking it 2nd out of 93 journals in the category "Anthropology".

References

External links 
 

Publications established in 1992
Anthropology journals
Evolutionary biology journals
Wiley-Liss academic journals
English-language journals
Bimonthly journals
Review journals